Henry Feilden may refer to:

Henry Feilden (Conservative politician) (1818–1875), English Conservative politician
Henry Wemyss Feilden (1838–1921), British Army officer, Arctic explorer and naturalist
Sir Henry Wemyss Feilden, 6th Baronet (1916–2010), of the Feilden baronets
Sir Henry Rudyard Feilden, 7th Baronet (born 1951), of the Feilden baronets

See also
Henry Fielding (disambiguation)
Feilden (surname)